Phia Andersson (born 1955) is a Swedish politician of the Social Democratic Party. She has been a member of the Riksdag from 2006 to 2018.  Her constituency is that of South West Götaland County.

References 

1955 births
Living people
People from Falkenberg
Members of the Riksdag from the Social Democrats
Women members of the Riksdag
Members of the Riksdag 2006–2010
Members of the Riksdag 2010–2014
Members of the Riksdag 2014–2018
21st-century Swedish women politicians